Jack Davies may refer to:

Jack Davies (screenwriter) (1913–1994), English screenwriter, producer, editor and actor
Jack Llewelyn Davies (1894–1959), one of the inspirations for the boy characters in Peter Pan
Jack Davies (rugby), Welsh rugby union and rugby league footballer who played in the 1940s, 1950s and 1960s
Jack Davies (football trainer), British football trainer
Jack Davies (swimmer) (1916–1997), New Zealand swimmer
Jack Davies (cricketer, born 1911) (1911–1992), English psychologist and sportsman
Jack Davies (cricketer, born 2000), English cricketer
Jack Davies (footballer, born 2002), English footballer for MK Dons
Jack Davies (rugby league Australia), Australian rugby league footballer who played in the 1920s and 1930s
Jack Davies (footballer, born 1902) (1902–1985), English footballer

See also
Jack Davis (disambiguation)
John Davies (disambiguation)